Al-Andalus Mosque is a mosque in the neighbourhood of Arroyo del Cuarto city of Málaga, Andalusia, Spain.

Structure
The mosque has 4,000 square meters and two entrances, one for men and one for women. It has a kindergarten, an auditorium for 200 people, three prayer rooms, classrooms, library or Arabic classes are taught among other services. It has a capacity for 1,000 people, making it one of the largest mosques in Europe.

The minaret of the mosque is 25 meters high.

Gallery

References

Buildings and structures in Málaga
Sunni mosques in Spain